David M. Perlmutter (born 1938) is an American linguist and professor emeritus in Linguistics at the University of California, San Diego. He is a fellow of the American Academy of Arts and Sciences and the Linguistic Society of America and served as president of the Linguistic Society in 2000.

References 

Living people
Linguists from the United States
University of California, San Diego faculty
Linguistic Society of America presidents
1938 births
Fellows of the Linguistic Society of America